Gilliard is a surname. Notable people with the surname include:

 Carl Gilliard (born 1958), American actor, director, and producer
 Clifton Gilliard (1938–2017), American football player, coach, and college athletics administrator
 Ernest Thomas Gilliard (1912–1965), American ornithologist
 Lawrence Gilliard Jr., African-American character actor
 Nicolas Gilliard (born 1947), Swiss swimmer who competed at the 1968 Summer Olympics
 Pierre Gilliard (1879–1962), Swiss citizen and French tutor for the five children of Tsar Nicholas II from 1905 to 1918
 Alexandra Tegleva Gilliard (1894–1955), Russian nursemaid for the five children of Tsar Nicholas II, wife of Pierre Gilliard
 Seth Gilliard (born 1989 or 1990), South Carolina violinist who covers pop tunes
 Steve Gilliard, (1964–2007), American liberal journalist and blogger
 Wendell Gilliard (born 1954), American politician, steelworker, and union official

See also
Gillard (disambiguation)
Gilliard's bird of paradise, named after Ernest Thomas Gilliard
Gilliard's flying fox, a mammal
Gilliard's honeyeater, a species of bird described by Ernest Thomas Gilliard